Apollonius (fl. 443–451) was a general of the Eastern Roman Empire.

Biography 

Apollonius was a Pagan and well-educated. Before 448 he converted to Christianity. He received two letters by Theodoret.

He was magister militum praesentalis in the East at least since 443 and until 451, when he was sent to Attila as ambassador; in that occasion the King of the Huns sent Apollonius back as he had not brought the tribute Attila had been expecting.

Apollonius might be the Flavius Apollonius who was consul in 460.

Notes

Bibliography 
 Jones, Arnold Hugh Martin, John Robert Martindale, John Morris, "Apollonius 3", The Prosopography of the Later Roman Empire, Cambridge University Press, 1980, p. 121.

5th-century Christians
5th-century Romans
Converts to Christianity from pagan religions
Correspondents of Theodoret
Magistri militum